Wilkins Strait is a natural waterway through the central Canadian Arctic Archipelago. It is mostly in the Northwest Territories, although its eastern extremity is in Nunavut. It separates Borden Island (to the north) from Brock Island (to the south-west) and Mackenzie King Island (to the south).

Straits of the Northwest Territories
Straits of Qikiqtaaluk Region